Hawai is the district headquarters of the newly created Anjaw District in the state of Arunachal Pradesh in north-east India.

Location
It is located at an altitude of 1296 m above sea level on the banks of the Lohit River, a tributary of the Brahmaputra River.

It is nearly 50 km south of Walong airstrip, 80 km south of India-China LAC (at Kaho), and 120 km southwest of Diphu Pass near India-China-Myanmar tri-junction.

Etymology
"Hawai" in Kaman Mishmi dialect means "Pond". The Mishmi are the main ethnic tribe in Anjaw District.

Transport
The  proposed Mago-Thingbu to Vijaynagar Arunachal Pradesh Frontier Highway along the McMahon Line, (will intersect with the proposed East-West Industrial Corridor Highway) and will pass through this district, alignment map of which can be seen here  and here.

Demographics
As per 2011 Indian census, Hawai had a population of 982 of which 625 are males while 357 are females. Population of children with age 0-6 is 83 which is 8.45% of total population of Hawai. Hawai has an average literacy rate of 80.31%, higher than the state average of 65.38% and national average of 74.04%. Male literacy rate is around 76.79%, and female literacy rate is 86.90%. The female sex ratio is 571 against state average of 938. Moreover, child sex ratio in Hawai is around 1128 compared to the state average of 972.

Religion
 

According to the 2011 census, 87.78% of the population is Hindu, 8.45% Muslim, 2.44% Christian and 1.32% Buddhist.

Languages

According to Census 2011, Mishmi is Spoken by 381 people, Nepali at 166 people, Bengali by 103 people, both Hindi and Assamese at 65.

Media
Hawai has an All India Radio Relay station known as Akashvani Hawai. It broadcasts on FM frequencies.

Banking Facilities

The list of banks functioning in Hawai:

State Bank of India, Hawai

See also

 North-East Frontier Agency
 List of people from Arunachal Pradesh
 Religion in Arunachal Pradesh
 Cuisine of Arunachal Pradesh
 List of institutions of higher education in Arunachal Pradesh

External links
AnJaw District

References 

Cities and towns in Anjaw district